Stefan Karadzha (pronounced [kaɾadʒˈa]; ; born Stefan Todorov Dimov, Стефан Тодоров Димов; 11 May 1840 – 31 July 1868), was a Bulgarian national hero, a revolutionary from the national liberation movement and a prominent leader of rebellion against the Ottoman Empire.

He was born in the village of Ichme (now Stefan Karadzhovo), near Yambol in Rumelia, and was reputedly a descendant of Momchil Voyvoda. Karadzha studied in Tulcea, Dobruja, but quit school due to lack of funding. During a wedding celebration, he defeated the famous Turkish wrestler Gaazi Plisa. Going in hiding for some time, as Ottoman authorities were searching for him, he then emigrated to Principality of Romania and later joined the First Bulgarian Legion in Belgrade, Principality of Serbia.

Karadzha crossed the Danube from Wallachia a couple of times, carrying out revolutionary tasks. In 1867, he joined the Second Bulgarian Legion, which he quit the following year before returning to Romania, where he had a meeting with Hadzhi Dimitar. On 6 June, both of them were leaders of a detachment of 129 people, and crossed the Danube at Vardim, near Svishtov. Their cheta was supposed to get to Stara planina and establish there a revolutionary government which would then command a general uprising of all Bulgarians. This was not to happen, though, as the group was discovered by Turkish forces shortly after crossing the river. Stefan Karadzha was badly wounded during the fight at Kanladere near Vishovgrad, and was captured by the army and police sent by the chairman of the State Council, Midhat Pasha. Afterwards, on 12 July, he was convoyed to Tarnovo, and later to Rousse.

Karadzha was standing half-dead before the emergency Turkish court, assembled by Midhat Pasha, the so-called criminal council, and sentenced to death by hanging, but died from his wounds before the execution. He was buried by Tonka Obretenova, who preserved his skull.

Honours
Stefan Karadzha Peak on Graham Land, Antarctica is named after Stefan Karadzha.

References

External links
 

1840 births
1868 deaths
People from Yambol Province
Bulgarian revolutionaries
Executed Bulgarian people
Executed revolutionaries
People executed by the Ottoman Empire by hanging
19th-century Bulgarian people
19th-century executions by the Ottoman Empire